The Salah Bey Mosque is a mosque in Annaba, Algeria. It was built between 1791 and 1792.

See also
 Lists of mosques
 List of mosques in Africa
 List of mosques in Algeria

References

External links 

 Images of Salah Bey Mosque in Manar al-Athar digital image archive resource

Buildings and structures in Annaba
Mosques in Algeria
Ottoman Mosques in Algeria
Mosques completed in 1792
Sunni mosques
Sunni Islam in Algeria
Landmarks in Algeria
1792 establishments in the Ottoman Empire
1792 establishments in Africa
18th-century religious buildings and structures in Algeria